Lithuania participated in the Eurovision Song Contest 2015 with the song "This Time" written by Vytautas Bikus and Monika Liubinaitė. The song was performed by Monika Linkytė and Vaidas Baumila. The Lithuanian broadcaster Lithuanian National Radio and Television (LRT) organised the national final "Eurovizijos" dainų konkurso nacionalinė atranka (Eurovision Song Contest national selection) in order to select the Lithuanian entry for the 2015 contest in Vienna, Austria. The national final took place over eight weeks and involved 12 artists and 12 songs competing in two different competitive streams. The results of each show were determined by the combination of votes from a jury panel and a public vote, and "This Time" performed by Monika Linkytė and Vaidas Baumila eventually emerged as the winner following the final.

Lithuania was drawn to compete in the second semi-final of the Eurovision Song Contest which took place on 21 May 2015. Performing as the opening entry for the show in position 1, "This Time" was announced among the top 10 entries of the second semi-final and therefore qualified to compete in the final on 23 May. It was later revealed that Lithuania placed seventh out of the 17 participating countries in the semi-final with 67 points. In the final, Lithuania performed in position 7 and placed 18th out of the 27 participating countries, scoring 30 points.

Background 

Prior to the 2015 contest, Lithuania had participated in the Eurovision Song Contest 15 times since its first entry in 1994. The nation’s best placing in the contest was sixth, which it achieved in 2006 with the song "We Are the Winners" performed by LT United. Following the introduction of semi-finals in 2004, Lithuania, to this point, has managed to qualify to the final six times. In the 2014 contest, "Attention" performed by Vilija failed to qualify to the final.

For the 2015 contest, the Lithuanian national broadcaster, Lithuanian National Radio and Television (LRT), broadcast the event within Lithuania and organised the selection process for the nation's entry. Other than the internal selection of their debut entry in 1994, Lithuania has selected their entry consistently through a national final procedure. LRT confirmed their intentions to participate at the 2015 Eurovision Song Contest on 4 June 2014 and announced the organization of "Eurovizijos" dainų konkurso nacionalinė atranka, which would be the national final to select Lithuania's entry for Vienna.

Before Eurovision

"Eurovizijos" dainų konkurso nacionalinė atranka 
"Eurovizijos" dainų konkurso nacionalinė atranka (Eurovision Song Contest national selection) was the national final format developed by LRT in order to select Lithuania's entry for the Eurovision Song Contest 2015. The competition involved an eight-week-long process that commenced on 3 January 2015 and concluded with a winning song on 14 February 2015 and a winning artist on 21 February 2015. The eight shows took place at the LRT studios in Vilnius and were hosted by Simona Nainė and Arūnas Valinskas. The shows were broadcast on LRT televizija, LRT Lituanica and LRT Radijas as well as online via the broadcaster's website lrt.lt.

Format
The 2015 competition consisted of eight shows and involved artists competing independently from songs, potentially being paired with any of the selected songs. Rule changes included the ability for artists to indicate a preference to perform a particular song on their application. Should the artist and their song reach the final, the artist and the composers were to agree to allow the other finalists to perform the song. In the first six shows, the 12 competing artists performed covers that related to the theme of that particular show and the potential Eurovision songs. The voting results from the first show were combined with those of the second show and the first artist was eliminated. During each of the third to sixth shows, one artist was eliminated and the remaining three artists advanced in the competition. Starting from the third show, the 12 potential Eurovision songs competed online on a weekly basis and a total of nine songs were eliminated following the sixth show, leaving three songs remaining. The seventh show was the competition's semi-final where only the winning song was selected from the remaining three songs, while the eighth show was the final where the winning artist-song combination was selected from the remaining three artists. Monetary prizes were also awarded to both the winning artist and songwriters. The Lithuanian Copyright Protection Association (LATGA) sponsored 15,000 LTL, awarded to the songwriters in order to encourage further development of the song in an aim to achieve international success, while the Music Association Annual Awards (MAMA) sponsored 5,000 LTL , awarded to the artist in order to assist in their preparation for the Eurovision Song Contest.

The results of each of the eight shows were determined by the 50/50 combination of votes from a jury panel and public voting. The ranking developed by both streams of voting was converted to points from 1-8, 10 and 12 and assigned based on the number of competing songs in the respective show. During the first seven shows, the jury votes consisted of a Lithuanian jury panel consisting of four members and an international jury panel consisting of three members. In the final, a two-member Lithuanian panel and the three-member international panel voted. The public could vote through telephone and SMS voting. Ties in the elimination shows and the semi-final were decided in favour of the entry that received the most votes from the public, while in the final, a tie would be decided in favour of the entry that was awarded the most points by the jury.

Competing artists and songs
On 31 October 2014, LRT opened two separate submission forms: one for artists and another for songwriters to submit their songs. The submission deadline for both applications concluded on 15 December 2014. On 18 December 2014, LRT announced the 12 artists selected for the competition. The 12 potential Eurovision songs selected from 168 submissions received were announced for listening and voting on 13 January 2015. The song "Skęstu" was originally entered in Lithuanian, however, the song was also translated and performed in English during the fourth elimination show.

Artist and song progress in the shows

Artists

Songs

Shows

Elimination shows 
The six elimination shows of the competition aired between 3 January and 7 February 2015 and featured the 12 competing artists. Audrius Giržadas temporarily replaced Arūnas Valinskas as a host during the fourth show. The members of the Lithuanian jury consisted of Ramūnas Zilnys (music reviewer; all shows), Juozas Liesis (journalist, first show), Edmundas Seilius (opera singer; first and second show), Linas Adomaitis (musician; first and second show), Audrius Giržadas (LRT chief producer; second show), Sigutė Stonytė (opera singer; third show), Vytautas Lukočius (conductor; third show), Justė Arlauskaitė (singer; third show), Gediminas Zujus (producer; fourth show), Ieva Norkūnienė (choreographer; fourth show), Darius Užkuraitis (LRT Opus director; fourth to sixth shows), Rosita Čivilytė (singer; fifth and sixth show) and Gintaras Rinkevičius (conductor; fifth and sixth show). International jury members included Lela Tsurtsumia (Georgian singer; all shows), René Romkes (organiser of the annual Eurovision in Concert event in the Netherlands; all shows), Peter Jenner (British music manager; second show) and Ralfs Eilands (Latvian singer; third to sixth shows).

In the first two shows, the artists performed covers that related to the theme of that particular show: Lithuanian hit songs in the first show and worldwide hit songs in the second show. The results of the both shows were combined and one artist was eliminated. The remaining 11 artists in the competition performed the potential Eurovision songs starting from the third show. The artists each performed one song between the third and fifth shows and two songs in the sixth show, and one artist was eliminated per show. The group Rollikai, which was eliminated following the second show, recorded a performance for the song "Sound of Colours" for the third show, however, the performance was not part of the show as they were previously eliminated. Milita Daikerytė withdrew from the competition following the third show due to illness.

Song selection 
The 12 potential Eurovision songs were evaluated by the public through an internet vote on LRT's voting platform over three rounds. The first round resulted in the elimination of one song, while the second round resulted in the elimination of two songs. The results of first two rounds were determined solely by public voting on LRT's internet platform. In the third round, the top three songs as determined by the 50/50 combination of votes from a jury panel and the internet vote advanced to the semi-final, while the bottom eight were eliminated. An additional round was to take place following the second round resulting in the elimination of two songs, however, it was cancelled as voting was extended by a week until 25 January 2014.

Semi-final
The semi-final of the competition aired on 14 February 2015 and featured each of the remaining three artists that qualified from the sixth elimination show each performing the remaining three potential Eurovision songs. The members of the Lithuanian jury consisted of Ramūnas Zilnys (music reviewer), Rosita Čivilytė (singer), Gediminas Zujus (producer) and Vytautas Lukočius (conductor). International jury members included Ralfs Eilands (Latvian singer), Lela Tsurtsumia (Georgian singer) and René Romkes (organiser of the annual Eurovision in Concert event in the Netherlands). "This Time" was selected as the winning song after gaining the most points from both the jury vote and the public vote.

Final
The final of the competition took place on 21 February 2015 and featured the remaining three artists that qualified from the sixth elimination show each performing three songs: two covers of their choice and the winning song selected from the semi-final, "This Time". Vaidas Baumila and Monika Linkytė performed together as a duet at the request of Vytautas Bikus, one of the songwriters of "This Time". The final was the only show in the competition to be broadcast live; all other preceding shows were pre-recorded earlier in the week before their airdates. Jury voting in the final was decided by a two-member Lithuanian panel and a three-member international panel. The members of the Lithuanian panel consisted of Ramūnas Zilnys (music reviewer) and Rosita Civilytė (singer). The international panel consisted of Ralfs Eilands (Latvian singer), Eric Lehmann (President of OGAE Luxembourg) and René Romkes (organiser of the annual Eurovision in Concert event in the Netherlands). Vaidas Baumila and Monika Linkytė were selected as the winners after gaining the most points from both the jury vote and the public vote. In addition to the performances of the competing artists, interval acts included 2013 Latvian Eurovision entry PeR performing the song "Smile" and Mélanie René performing the 2015 Swiss Eurovision entry "Time to Shine".

Preparation
On 7 March, LRT broadcast the support concert Būkime kartu where Lithuanian viewers could call to donate funds to support the Lithuanian Eurovision participation. The concert featured guests Leon Somov and Justė Arlauskaitė, Rosita Čivilytė and Jurgis Brūzga, and raised €20,843 from the public donations. In late March, Monika Linkytė and Vaidas Baumila filmed the official music video for "This Time" at the Qpolo bar in Vilnius. The video, directed by Algina Navickaitė, was released on 13 April. Lithuanian and French language versions of "This Time" were released on 22 April. The Lithuanian version had lyrics written by Vytautas Bikus while lyrics for the French version were written by Dominique Dufaut.

Promotion 
Monika Linkytė and Vaidas Baumila made several appearances across Europe to specifically promote "This Time" as the Lithuanian Eurovision entry. On 17 April, Linkytė and Baumila performed during the Eurovision PreParty Riga, which was organised by OGAE Latvia and held at the Palladium Concert Hall in Riga, Latvia. On 18 April, the duet performed during the Eurovision in Concert event which was held at the Melkweg venue in Amsterdam, Netherlands and hosted by Cornald Maas and Edsilia Rombley.

At Eurovision 

According to Eurovision rules, all nations with the exceptions of the host country and the "Big Five" (France, Germany, Italy, Spain and the United Kingdom) are required to qualify from one of two semi-finals in order to compete for the final; the top 10 countries from each semi-final progress to the final. In the 2015 contest, Australia also competed directly in the final as an invited guest nation. The European Broadcasting Union (EBU) split up the competing countries into five different pots based on voting patterns from previous contests, with countries with favourable voting histories put into the same pot. On 26 January 2015, an allocation draw was held which placed each country into one of the two semi-finals, as well as which half of the show they would perform in. Lithuania was placed into the second semi-final, to be held on 21 May 2015, and was scheduled to perform in the first half of the show.

Once all the competing songs for the 2015 contest had been released, the running order for the semi-finals was decided by the shows' producers rather than through another draw, so that similar songs were not placed next to each other. Lithuania was set to open the show performing in position 1, before the entry from Ireland.

The two semi-finals and final were broadcast in Lithuania on LRT televizija and LRT Radijas with commentary by Darius Užkuraitis. The Lithuanian spokesperson, who announced the Lithuanian votes during the final, was Ugnė Galadauskaitė.

Semi-final

Monika Linkytė and Vaidas Baumila took part in technical rehearsals on 13 and 16 May, followed by dress rehearsals on 20 and 21 May. This included the jury final where professional juries of each country, responsible for 50 percent of each country's vote, watched and voted on the competing entries.

The Lithuanian performance featured Monika Linkytė and Vaidas Baumila performing choreography on stage with two female and two male backing vocalists. The LED screens displayed bright colourful rays in shades of red, blue, yellow and orange. The performance also featured a kiss shared between Linkytė and Baumila with the two female backing vocalists and two male backing vocalists kissing as well. Vaidas Baumila's bluish-grey costume. Baumila's suit was designed by Andrius Sergejenko, while Monika Linkytė's bluish-pink and white dress was designed by Kristina Kalinauskaitė along with citizens of Lithuania, who were able to cut-out petals featured on the dress in the colour of their choice at special booths set up in Klaipėda, Panevėžys and Vilnius in April 2015. The two female backing vocalists that joined Linkytė and Baumila were Rūta Žibaitytė and Justė Kraujalytė, while the two male backing vocalists were Dainotas Varnas and Jurijus Veklenko. Veklenko would go on to represent Lithuania in the Eurovision Song Contest 2019.

At the end of the show, Lithuania was announced as having finished in the top 10 and subsequently qualifying for the grand final. It was later revealed that the Lithuania placed seventh in the semi-final, receiving a total of 67 points.

Final
Shortly after the second semi-final, a winner's press conference was held for the 10 qualifying countries. As part of this press conference, the qualifying artists took part in a draw to determine which half of the grand final they would subsequently participate in. This draw was done in the order the countries were announced during the semi-final. Lithuania was drawn to compete in the first half. Following this draw, the shows' producers decided upon the running order of the final, as they had done for the semi-finals. Lithuania was subsequently placed to perform in position 7, following the entry from Armenia and before the entry from Serbia.

Monika Linkytė and Vaidas Baumila once again took part in dress rehearsals on 22 and 23 May before the final, including the jury final where the professional juries cast their final votes before the live show. The duet performed a repeat of their semi-final performance during the final on 23 May. At the conclusion of the voting, Lithuania placed 18th with 30 points.

Voting
Voting during the three shows consisted of 50 percent public televoting and 50 percent from a jury deliberation. The jury consisted of five music industry professionals who were citizens of the country they represent, with their names published before the contest to ensure transparency. This jury was asked to judge each contestant based on: vocal capacity; the stage performance; the song's composition and originality; and the overall impression by the act. In addition, no member of a national jury could be related in any way to any of the competing acts in such a way that they cannot vote impartially and independently. The individual rankings of each jury member were released shortly after the grand final.

Following the release of the full split voting by the EBU after the conclusion of the competition, it was revealed that Lithuania had placed 16th with both the public televote and the jury vote in the final. In the public vote, Lithuania scored 44 points, while with the jury vote, Lithuania scored 31 points. In the second semi-final, Lithuania placed sixth with the public televote with 98 points and 10th with the jury vote, scoring 52 points.

Below is a breakdown of points awarded to Lithuania and awarded by Lithuania in the second semi-final and grand final of the contest, and the breakdown of the jury voting and televoting conducted during the two shows:

Points awarded to Lithuania

Points awarded by Lithuania

Detailed voting results
The following members comprised the Lithuania jury:
 Lauras Lučiūnas (jury chairperson)music producer
 Jolita Vaitkevičienėchoir conductor
 Jurga Čekatauskaitėjournalist, author of song lyrics
 singer
 singer

Notes and references

Notes

References

2015
Countries in the Eurovision Song Contest 2015
Eurovision